Fair Trade Services, formerly known as INO Records, is an American record label based in Brentwood, Tennessee, specializing in Contemporary Christian music (CCM).

History 
The label was founded in 1999 as INO Records, a division of M2 Communications. Integrity Media acquired the label in 2002. When Integrity Media was sold to David C. Cook in 2011, label founder and president Jeff Moseley purchased the label assets and renamed it Fair Trade Services.

It was the parent label of SRE Recordings, which concentrated more on Christian rock releases until that label closed with the sale of INO Records to founder Jeff Moseley. All remaining SRE recording artists are under the banner of Fair Trade Services.

The Mission of Fair Trade Services
We desire to work with artists who have a unique message, excellent artistry and spiritual maturity while serving them well through partnering. Our chief aim is to know God and make Him known through products that are spiritually significant, artistically excellent and culturally relevant.

Roster

 Austin French
 CeCe Winans
 Colton Dixon (Atlantic Records)
 Hope Darst
 Laura Story
 LEDGER (Atlantic Records)
 MercyMe
 Micah Tyler
 Mike Donehey
 Phil Wickham
 Sara Groves
 Skillet (Atlantic Records)
 The Afters

Fair Trade Gospel

 Anthony Brown
 CeCe Winans
 Charles Butler
 Jason Nelson
 Myron Butler
 Maranda Curtis
 Geoffrey Golden
 Vashawn Mitchell
 L. Spenser Smith
 Rich Tolbert Jr.

Former

 4Him (disbanded)
 33Miles
 Audio Adrenaline (disbanded) 
 Addison Road (disbanded)
 Todd Agnew (Ardent/Fair Trade)
 Ashes Remain
 Beautiful Eulogy (Humble Beast/Fair Trade)
 Blindside
 Building 429
 Caedmon's Call
 Catalyst Music Project
 Chasen
 Citizen Way
 Connersvine (active, unsigned)
 Decyfer Down
 Jonny Diaz (active, with Centricity)
 The Digital Age
 Disciple
 Echoing Angels (active, with Patton House)
 Anthony Evans
 Mike Farris
 Fee
 Flyleaf (active, with Loud & Proud)
 The Fray (Epic/Fair Trade)
Gateway Worship
 Mark Harris (now part of Gateway Worship)
 Micah Stampley
 Hawk Nelson
 Jack Cassidy
 Jackie Hill-Perry (Humble Beast/Fair Trade)
 Jasmine Murray
 Jeremy Horn (Ardent/Fair Trade)
 Jonas Brothers (active, with Hollywood)
 Nick Jonas (part of The Jonas Brothers and Nick Jonas and the Administration)
 Sandi Patty
 P.O.D. (active, signed with Razor & Tie)
 Chris Rice
 Rock n Roll Worship Circus (disbanded)
 Shane & Shane
 Mark Schultz
 Newsboys
Phillips, Craig and Dean (Columbia/Fair Trade)
Propaganda (Humble Beast/Fair Trade)
 Jenny Simmons
 SONICFLOOd (active, unsigned)
 Stellar Kart
 Sanctus Real
 Ten Shekel Shirt (active, with Rounder)
 John Tibbs
 Derek Webb
 Joy Whitlock
 Heather Williams
 Kara Williamson (active, as Kara Tualatai part of Prelude trio on Trackstar Recordworks)
 Veritas
 VOTA
 Darlene Zschech
 Zauntee

See also
 List of record labels

References

External links

American record labels
Evangelical Christian record labels
2011 establishments in Tennessee